Volcán Maderas Natural Reserve is a nature reserve on the island of Ometepe in Nicaragua. The reserve contains Volcán Maderas, an extinct 1,394 volcano surround by a cloud forest, The crater contains a lagoon.  The reserve requires that any climbing the volcano hire a guide.

The reserve also has petroglyph tours, coffee and cacao tours, horseback riding, and the San Ramón waterfall.

Protected areas of Nicaragua